Kennar Valley is a small valley, ice free except for a lobe of ice marginal to Taylor Glacier at the mouth, located west of Finger Mountain in the Quartermain Mountains of Victoria Land, Antarctica. The name appears to be first used on a 1961 New Zealand Lands and Survey Department map compiled from New Zealand field surveys, 1957–60, and U.S. Navy aerial photographs of that period. It was possibly named after Thomas Kennar, Royal Navy, Petty Officer on the Discovery during the British National Antarctic Expedition, 1901–04, led by R.F. Scott. In November 1903, Kennar and William J. Weller accompanied Hartley T. Ferrar in the first geological reconnaissance of the Quartermain Mountains.

See also
 Mount Weller

References

Valleys of Victoria Land
McMurdo Dry Valleys